Nalli may refer to:
 Nalî (1800–?), Kurdish poet
 Nalli (surname), a last name
 Nalli, Sattur, a village in Sattur taluk, India
 Nalli (wardrobe store), an Indian wardrobe store and silk saree emporium